José Silvestre White Lafitte (17 January 1836, in Matanzas, Cuba – 12–15 March 1918, Paris, France), also known as Joseph White, was a Cuban-French violinist and composer.

Biography
His father Don Carlos White was Spanish and his mother was Afro-Cuban.

After receiving early musical training from his father, who was an amateur violinist, José White gave his first concert in Matanzas on 21 March 1854. He was accompanied by the visiting American pianist-composer Louis Moreau Gottschalk, "who encouraged him to pursue further violin studies in Paris and raised money for him to travel there". José White studied at the Paris Conservatory, initially with Jean-Delphin Alard, between the years 1855 and 1871, winning the 1856 First Grand Prize. He became a French citizen in 1870, and was highly praised by Rossini.

From 1877 to 1889 White was director of the Imperial Conservatory in Rio de Janeiro, Brazil, where he served as court musician for the Emperor Pedro II. Afterwards he returned to Paris to spend the rest of his days. The famous 1737 "Swansong" Stradivari was his instrument.

Compositions
Mainly written for his own instrument, White's output comprised some 30 works, including a virtuosic Violin Concerto in F# Minor, recorded in 1975 by Aaron Rosand and in 1997 by Rachel Barton Pine. Other works include La Bella Cubana (a habanera for two violins and orchestra), La Jota Aragonesa (Op.5), and several sets of violin Études, of which Josephine Wright wrote:

References

External links
 https://web.archive.org/web/20070221123310/http://www.concentric.net/%7Erwam/JWSQFlyer.pdf
 José Silvestre White, Afro-Cuban Composer, Violinist & Professor at AfriClassical.com
 

1836 births
1918 deaths
19th-century classical composers
19th-century classical violinists
19th-century male musicians
20th-century classical composers
20th-century classical violinists
20th-century male musicians
Contradanza
Cuban classical composers
Cuban violinists
Cuban people of Spanish descent
Male classical violinists
Conservatoire de Paris alumni
Pupils of Lambert Massart
People from Matanzas